Smékal (Czech feminine: Smékalová) or Smekal is a surname of Czech language origin (variation of Smejkal). Notable people with the surname include:

 Adolf Smekal (1895–1959), Austrian physicist
 Dominik Smékal (born 1998), Czech footballer
 Florence Marly, born Hana Smékalová (1919–1978), Czech-French actress

See also
 
 
Šmejkal/Smejkal
Renata Šmekálová

Czech-language surnames